The Nigeria men's national tennis team represents Nigeria in Davis Cup tennis competition and are governed by the Nigeria Tennis Federation.

Nigeria currently compete in Africa Zone Group III.  They reached the Group I semifinals in 1988 and 1989.

History
Nigeria competed in its first Davis Cup in 1974.

Current team (2022) 

 Wilson Oswalele Igbinovia
 Nonso Madueke
 Abayomi Oluseyi Philips

See also
Davis Cup

External links

Davis Cup teams
Davis Cup
Davis Cup
1974 establishments in Nigeria
Sports clubs established in 1974